Botswana National Olympic Committee is the National Olympic Committee representing Botswana. It is also the body responsible for Botswana's representation at the Commonwealth Games.

The Botswana National Olympic Committee (BNOC) has facilitated Botswana's participation at the Summer Olympic Games in Moscow in 1980 and the country has never missed an edition since then. Botswana recorded their best performance at the Summer Olympic Games in London in 2012, when Nijel Amos won the country their only medal to date, a silver medal. 

While Botswana did not win any medal at the inaugural Youth Olympic Games in Singapore in 2010, the country performed well in the 2nd edition in Nanjing China, where they won two (2) silver medals, which performance was the fourth best by an African country at the Games.

The BNOC was behind Botswana's successful bid for the 2nd African Youth Games that the country hosted from 22 to 31 May 2014. The BNOC seconded a few of its staff members, including Chief Executive Tuelo Serufho to the Organising Committee of the 2nd African Youth Games that were known as Gaborone 2014.

See also
Botswana at the Olympics
Botswana at the Commonwealth Games

References

External links
 Official website

Botswana
Botswana
Sports governing bodies in Botswana
Botswana at the Olympics
1978 establishments in Botswana
Sports organizations established in 1978